The Changing of the Guard or The Change of the Guard may refer to:
 Guard mounting, a formal ceremony in which sentries providing ceremonial guard duties at important institutions are relieved by a new batch of sentries.

It may also refer to:

Film and television 
 The Changing of the Guard (film), a 1962 French-Italian comedy film
 "The Changing of the Guard" (The Twilight Zone), a 1962 episode of The Twilight Zone
 "Changing of the Guard" (Voltron: Legendary Defender), a 2017 episode of Voltron: Legendary Defender

Literature 
 The Changing of the Guard (novel), the eighth book in the Star Wars Jedi Quest series

Music 
 The Changing of the Guard (album), a 2010 album by indie rock band, Starflyer 59
 Changing of the Guard (T. S. Monk album), 1993
 "Changing of the Guards", a 1978 song by Bob Dylan
 "Changing of the Guards", a song by Pusha T
 "Changing of the Guard", a song by the band Exodus from their album Impact Is Imminent
 "The Changing of the Guard", a song by Marquis of Kensington
 "Change of the Guard", a song by Steely Dan from their album Can't Buy a Thrill
 "Changing of the Guard", a song by The Style Council from their album Confessions of a Pop Group